Stephen Payne Adye (ca. 1740 – 1794) was an English brevet-major of the Royal Artillery.

Life
He entered the Royal Military Academy, Woolwich, as a cadet, in 1757, and was appointed as second-lieutenant in the royal artillery in 1762. He served some time as brigade-major of artillery in North America, where he prepared his well-known book on courts-martial, entitled Treatise on Courts-Martial, to which is added an Essay on Military Punishments and Rewards. [Printed at New York, and reprinted in London, 1769.] The book went through several subsequent editions, the second appearing in London in 1778, and was modified by later editors.  He was a member of the American Philosophical Society, elected in 1772. Major Adye died in command of a company of invalid artillery, in Jersey, in 1794.

Family
Of three sons in the regiment, the eldest, Captain Ralph Willett Adye, who died in 1808, was author of the Pocket Gunner, a standard work of reference, which first appeared in 1798, and passed through many editions; the second, Major-General Stephen Galway Adye, served in the Iberian Peninsula and at the Battle of Waterloo, and died Chief Firemaster of the Royal Laboratory in 1838; the third, Major James Pattison Adye, died in 1831.

References

Royal Artillery officers
1740s births
1794 deaths